Kaptai High School, Rangamati is a secondary school located in the hill tracts of Rangamati, Bangladesh. It was established in 1981 in Kaptai, Rangamati, Chittagong.

Campus
 
The campus of this institution covers an area of 10 acres. The academic building is a two story, 'L' shaped Facilities available are a library, prayer room, and individual laboratories for Physics, Chemistry, Biology, Computer Science and other subjects.The main academic building has a one-storey extension inside the boundary named "New Academic Building". The school also has a library and laboratories for subjects including physics, chemistry, biology, and computer studies.

Courses
The school has three courses:
Arts 
Science
Commerce

Extra-curricular activities
This school is renowned for not only education, but also extra-curricular activities. It won the national championship of cricket, football several times. It has a large playground where the students can practice different games. Many inter-city and inter-school cricket and football tournament are held on the field of this school throughout the year.

The activities of Rover Scout are also held at this school. Every year, the school authority arranges inter-school sporting events in the school field.

Curriculum
The syllabus of every class is made by the teachers of this institution according to the syllabus of the Chittagong Education Board. The medium of instruction is Bengali. The students of class IX, X and SSC have to participate in the laboratory workout as well as theory classes. Three semester exams are taken in a year. These are 1st, 2nd and final semester. If a student fails in the final exam he or she will not be promoted in the next class. The students of class VIII and X have to participate in the Junior School Certificate Exam, and Secondary School Certificate Exam.

Admission
In January the school takes students in class VI, VII, VIII and IX. Students have to qualify in a highly competitive admission test in order to get admitted in this school.

Activities and achievements
Every year several students achieve good result in the whole education board. Student's got GOLDEN A+, not only in the education system, but also in the other sector like debating and cultural activity where they participate in national competition and bring a great result for the Kaptai High School.

Programs
Kaptai High School arranges different programs on the school campus. Former students of the school also arrange different program on different occasion.

See also
List of schools in Bangladesh

References

Educational institutions established in 1981
High schools in Bangladesh
Rangamati Hill District
1981 establishments in Bangladesh